The Ugra class was the NATO reporting name for a group of submarine tenders built for the Soviet Navy in the late 1960s. The Soviet designation was Project 1886. One further ship,  was built for the Indian Navy to a modified design. The ships were intended to provide afloat support, including supplies, water, torpedoes, fuel, and battery charging; minimal repair facilities, and were often employed as flagships/command ships for submarine squadrons.

Ships

Seven ships were built for the Soviet Navy in Nikolayev:

 Ivan Kolyshkin (launched 30 March 1972, commissioned 27 December 1972) 
 Ivan Kucherenko (launched 28 November 1965, commissioned 14 January 1967)
 Ivan Vakhrameev (launched 5 November 1968, commissioned 30 August 1969)
 Volga (launched 30 December 1966, commissioned 30 May 1968)
 Tobol (launched 31 September 1963, commissioned 25 September 1965)
 Vladimir Yegorov (launched 29 September 1962, commissioned 27 December 1963)
 Lena (launched 28 April 1963, commissioned 29 December 1964)

The last two Russian Navy ships Vladimir Yegorov and Volga were scrapped in the late 1990s.

The last active ship, INS Amba was decommissioned in 2006.

Borodino-class training ships

Two ships were completed to a modified (Project 1886U, Russian: 1886У) design as training ships. They were named Borodino (launched 30 January 1970, commissioned 16 January 1971) and Gangut (launched 30 December 1970, commissioned 10 October 1971). They were also scrapped in the late 1990s.

See also
List of ships of the Soviet Navy
List of ships of Russia by project number

References

External links
Page in English
Page in English
 All Ugra class submarine tenders - Complete Ship List

Ugra-class submarine tenders
Auxiliary depot ship classes